Inayetullah Khān, also known as Enayetullah, was a Faujdar of the Mughal Bengal's Sylhet Sarkar. He was the successor of Sadeq Khan as faujdar.

Life
In 1692, Khan granted land to Ram Jivan Chowdhury in Baurbhag Pargana. He also gave land to Mustafi Haji in Isamati Pargana.  The little town (now a Union Parishad) of Inatganj Bazar in Nabiganj was founded and named after him. Inatganj became a centre for the Asian Jute trade. The current Inatganj High School was originally a jute warehouse. Many ships would crowd in the banks of Inatganj Bazar, and go to many corners of the world, and evidence of this remains at the present high school. He preceded Faujdar Rafiullah Khan.

See also
History of Sylhet
Lutfullah Shirazi

References

Rulers of Sylhet
17th-century rulers in Asia
17th-century Indian Muslims